Mahamoud Mroivili (born 19 June 1986) is a Comorian international footballer who plays for Volcan Club, as a goalkeeper.

Career
Born in Mitsamiouli, Mroivili has played for Coin Nord and Volcan Club.

He made his international debut for Comoros in 2008.

References

1986 births
Living people
Comorian footballers
Comoros international footballers
Coin Nord de Mitsamiouli players
Volcan Club de Moroni players
Association football goalkeepers